Roger Scholes (11 December 1950 – 3 June 2022) was an Australian independent film and television maker from 1983 on. He worked as a producer, director, writer, script editor, cinematographer, and editor in drama and documentary projects for cinema and television.

Early career
Roger graduated from the Swinburne Film and TV School, now the University of Melbourne Faculty of VCA and MCM, in 1971 and worked at Fred Schepisi’s Film House in Melbourne. During the 70’s he worked in France, Switzerland, U.K. and United States. In 1982 he returned to Swinburne for the post-graduate course and was awarded Best Director at his graduation.

1980s
In December 1982 he directed and edited a short film The Franklin River blockade concerning the Franklin Dam.

During the 80’s he worked with his writer/film producer partner, Katherine Scholes, on a number of documentaries before writing and directing his first feature film The Tale of Ruby Rose. The film won four critics prizes at the Venice Film Festival in 1987 including Best Actress and Best Director.
In 1988 Roger and Katherine formed their production company, Edward Street Films. Together they produced numerous documentaries including The Valley, the last tall forests and Home of the brave which won First Prize at the International ITVA American Film Awards in 1993.

1990s
In 1996 Roger co-wrote and directed The Coolbaroo Club, a dramatized documentary for cinema and television release. It won the 1996 Human Rights Award for Media. In 1998 he co-wrote and directed The Human Journey, a 3-hour documentary series for ABC TV and Discovery Channel, which won the 2000 Eureka Prize for Science Media.

2000s
Since then he has written and directed the 3 hour teleseries Stories from the Stone Age which gained a record viewership for ABC TV, S4c and Channel 4. His documentary series Last Port of Call and Future Shack gained the highest documentary rating for the ABC in 2006 with 1.2 million viewers and 2010 series The Passionate Apprentices gained the highest Inside Australia slot rating ever for SBS TV.

Recent work
In 2014 Roger was the Cinematographer on the ABC documentary 'Defendant 5' and the Production Designer on the International History TV series 'Death or Liberty'.
Roger was preparing a number of films and online projects for production including a feature film Crow Bay, feature films Secret Cove, The Broken Hill and Dogtower and the documentaries Read My Lips, Christmas Play of Cape Barren and Journey to my African School.

Roger has worked as a cinematographer with over 35 years experience in celluloid and digital formats. He has written numerous screenplays for film and television and has worked as a production designer and script editor on many feature film, documentary and community education projects. He has also worked as a lecturer, mentor and tutor in film writing, directing, cinematography and production for many institutions including the Australian Film Television and Radio School, the Swinburne University Film and Television School, York University, Deakin University, Film Victoria, the Australian Film Commission, Screen Tasmania, La Trobe University, The Friends School, Kickstart Arts, Wide Angle Tasmania and has served as a board member for the Swinburne Film School [now the VCA], the Tasmanian Film Festival and Screen Tasmania.

References

1950 births
2022 deaths
Australian film directors